Stuart Fletcher may refer to:
Stuart Fletcher (cricketer), English cricketer
Stuart Fletcher (musician), English bass player